Raymond Wright Mack (July 15, 1927 – August 25, 2011) was an American sociologist known for his work on race relations and social inequality. He was the chair of the sociology department at Northwestern University from 1959 to 1967, and co-founded the Center for Urban Affairs there in 1968. He served as the Center's director from then to 1971, as Vice President and Dean of Faculties at Northwestern from 1971 to 1974, and as provost of the university from 1974 to 1987.

References

1927 births
2011 deaths
American sociologists
People from Ashtabula, Ohio
Baldwin Wallace University alumni
University of North Carolina alumni
Northwestern University faculty